The BMW B57 is a turbo-diesel straight-six engine, produced by BMW since 2015.

Design 
The B57 belongs to a family of modular engines, including the B37 and B47 diesel engines, and B38, B48, and B58 petrol engines. The B57 replaced the previous N57 diesel engine, and was first introduced in the G11 7 Series. The B57 is available in configurations of up to 4 turbochargers, that operate in a double-series layout.

Models

B57D30O0 (Single Turbo) 
 2015 - present G11 730d, 730Ld
 2017 - present G30 530d
 2017 - present G32 630d Gran Turismo
 2017 - present G01 X3 xDrive30d
 2018 - present G02 X4 xDrive30d
 2018 - present G05 X5 xDrive30d
 2018 - present G07 X7 xDrive30d
 2019 - present G20 330d
 2019 - present G06 X6 xDrive30d

B57D30T0 (Twin Turbo) 
 2015 - present G11 740d, 740Ld
 2017 - present G30 540d
 2017 - present G32 640d xDrive Gran Turismo
 2018 - present G01 X3 M40d
 2018 - present G02 X4 M40d
 2018 - present G15 840d xDrive
 2020 - present G20 M340d xDrive
 2020 - present G21 M340d xDrive
 2020 - present G22 M440d xDrive
 2020 - present G07 X7 xDrive40d

B57D30S0 (Quad Turbo) 
 2016 - 2020 G11 750d, 750Ld
 2017 - 2020 G30 M550d xDrive
 2018 - 2020 G05 X5 M50d
 2018 - 2020 G07 X7 M50d
 2019 - 2020 G06 X6 M50d

References 

BMW engines
Diesel engines by model
Straight-six engines
Products introduced in 2015